Zhou Peishun (Chinese: 周培顺; 1962 - ) is a former male Chinese weightlifter. He won a silver medal at 1984 Olympic Games in men's 52 kg.

References

Chinese male weightlifters
Olympic weightlifters of China
Weightlifters at the 1984 Summer Olympics
Olympic silver medalists for China
Living people
Olympic medalists in weightlifting
Medalists at the 1984 Summer Olympics
People from Taizhou, Jiangsu
Weightlifters from Jiangsu
Year of birth missing (living people)
20th-century Chinese people